The Keyport Public Schools are a comprehensive community public school district that serves students in pre-kindergarten through twelfth grade from Keyport, in Monmouth County, New Jersey, United States.

As of the 2018–19 school year, the district, comprised of two schools, had an enrollment of 1,062 students and 104.0 classroom teachers (on an FTE basis), for a student–teacher ratio of 10.2:1.

The district is classified by the New Jersey Department of Education as being in District Factor Group "CD", the sixth-highest of eight groupings. District Factor Groups organize districts statewide to allow comparison by common socioeconomic characteristics of the local districts. From lowest socioeconomic status to highest, the categories are A, B, CD, DE, FG, GH, I and J.

Students in public school for ninth through twelfth grades from Union Beach attend the district's high school as part of a sending/receiving relationship with the Union Beach School System.

Schools
Schools in the district (with 2018–19 enrollment data from the National Center for Education Statistics) are:
Elementary school
Keyport Central School with 687 students in grades PreK-8
Elijah Pereira, Principal
High school
Keyport High School with 364 students in grades 9-12
Michael P. Waters Sr., Principal

Administration
Core members of the district's administration are:
Dr. Lisa M. Savoia, Superintendent
Anthony Rapolla, Business Administrator / Board Secretary

Board of education
The district's board of education, comprised of nine members, sets policy and oversees the fiscal and educational operation of the district through its administration. As a Type II school district, the board's trustees are elected directly by voters to serve three-year terms of office on a staggered basis, with three seats up for election each year held (since 2012) as part of the November general election. The board appoints a superintendent to oversee the day-to-day operation of the district. A tenth member is appointed by Union Beach to represent that district's interests on the Keyport board.

References

External links
Keyport Public Schools
 
School Data for the Keyport Public Schools, National Center for Education Statistics

Keyport, New Jersey
New Jersey District Factor Group CD
School districts in Monmouth County, New Jersey